The Breakers Point Naval Guns are a historic World War II-era defensive fortification on the island of Tutuila in American Samoa.  It consists of two six-inch Mark 8 Model 2 naval guns, mounted on circular concrete platforms about 200 feet above sea level at the end of Papatele Ridge, which flanks the east side of Pago Pago Harbor.  The guns, manufactured in 1907, were emplaced in 1941 amid fears of a Japanese invasion of the island, and were left in situ (albeit disabled) after invasion fears subsided.  They were brought to the site by an innovative railway system that used locally crafted rails fashioned out of ifil wood when steel rails were not available.  The guns are located on private family-owned land, but may be hiked to with permission.

The site was listed on the National Register of Historic Places in 1999.

History
In October 1941, six-inch Naval guns arrived in Pago Pago in crates. There were four unwieldy cannons of this caliber, each measuring over twenty feet long and weighing ten tons. The guns had to somehow be lifted into the elevated newly made concrete positions on Breakers and Blunts Points, about 500 feet above ground level. The only available routes went through the jungle and up 70-degree, muddy slopes. There were no trails, roads nor paths leading to these four positions on each side of the Pago Pago Harbor. It was later determined that a tramway was needed in order to move the guns up the hills. The contractors immediately sent a request to Alameda, California for steel rails, hoisting gear, and cables.

See also
Blunts Point Battery, located across the harbor
National Register of Historic Places listings in American Samoa

References

External links
"Great Guns: Archaeologists uncover traces of a Pacific island’s wartime preparations" by Joseph Kennedy

Tutuila
United States Marine Corps installations
Buildings and structures on the National Register of Historic Places in American Samoa
Military installations established in 1940
United States Navy installations
World War II on the National Register of Historic Places
1940 establishments in American Samoa
Military installations closed in the 1940s